Narodychi Raion was a raion (district) of Zhytomyr Oblast, northern Ukraine. Its administrative centre was located at Narodychi. The raion was abolished on 18 July 2020 as part of the administrative reform of Ukraine, which reduced the number of raions of Zhytomyr Oblast to four. The area of Narodychi Raion was merged into Korosten Raion. The last estimate of the raion population was

History
Eastern part of the district included protection areas similar to those of Chernobyl Exclusion Zone which were heavily polluted as a result of the radioactive fallout from Chernobyl disaster in 1986.

Gallery

References

External links

Former raions of Zhytomyr Oblast
Chernobyl Exclusion Zone
1923 establishments in Ukraine
Ukrainian raions abolished during the 2020 administrative reform